Bokanowski is a Polish surname. People with this name include:
Gilbert Bokanowski (1920–1975), French film actor and film producer
Maurice Bokanowski (1879–1928), French lawyer and left-wing Republican politician
Michel Maurice-Bokanowski (1912– 2005), French politician (son of Maurice Bokanowski)
Michèle Bokanowski (born 1943), French composer
Patrick Bokanowski (born 1943), French filmmaker

See also 

 Bojanowski

Surnames
Surnames of Polish origin
Polish-language surnames